The 2015–16 season was Burnley's first season back in the Football League Championship following their relegation from the Premier League the previous season. This season marked their 134th year in existence. Along with the Championship, the club also competed in the FA Cup and Football League Cup. The season covers the period from 1 July 2015 to 30 June 2016.  On 2 May 2016, Burnley won promotion back to the Premier League, following a victory over Queens Park Rangers.

Match details

Football League Championship

League table

Matches

FA Cup

Football League Cup

Transfers

In

 Brackets around club names denote the player's contract with that club had expired before he joined Burnley.

Out

 Brackets around club names denote the player joined that club after his Burnley contract expired.

Loan out

Appearances and goals
Source:
Numbers in parentheses denote appearances as substitute.
Players with names struck through and marked  left the club during the playing season.
Players with names in italics and marked * were on loan from another club for the whole of their season with Burnley.
Players listed with no appearances have been in the matchday squad but only as unused substitutes.
Key to positions: GK – Goalkeeper; DF – Defender; MF – Midfielder; FW – Forward

See also
List of Burnley F.C. seasons

References

Burnley F.C. seasons
Burnley